Éric Jean Deloumeaux (born 12 May 1973 in Montbéliard, Doubs) is a French former football player. He spent his career in his native France and with a number of British clubs, including Coventry City (scoring once against Millwall) and Livingston (scoring once against Dundee United).

References

External links
 Official blog
 

1973 births
Living people
Sportspeople from Montbéliard
FC Gueugnon players
Le Havre AC players
Motherwell F.C. players
Aberdeen F.C. players
Coventry City F.C. players
Livingston F.C. players
French footballers
Scottish Premier League players
English Football League players
Ligue 1 players
Ligue 2 players
French expatriate footballers
Expatriate footballers in England
Expatriate footballers in Scotland
US Quevilly-Rouen Métropole players
CMS Oissel players
FCM Aubervilliers players
Association football defenders
Footballers from Bourgogne-Franche-Comté
French expatriate sportspeople in England
French expatriate sportspeople in Scotland